Komi-Permyak Okrug (Komi-Permyatsky okrug; , Komi-Perem kyč, or Permyakia is a territory with special status within Perm Krai, Russia. Its administrative center is the town of Kudymkar. Population: 

It was a federal subject of Russia (an autonomous okrug) until December 1, 2005. It was known as Komi-Permyak Autonomous Okrug at the time.

Geography
Area: 32,770 km². Location: foothills of the Ural Mountains, upper basin of the Kama River.

History
Komi-Permyak Autonomous Okrug was established on February 26, 1925. It was an administrative division for Komi-Permyaks, a branch of the Komis, within Perm Oblast. After a referendum held in October 2004, the autonomous okrug was merged with Perm Oblast to form Perm Krai. The referendum was held both in Komi-Permyak Autonomous Okrug and Perm Oblast, and the majority of citizens of both regions voted for merging.

Administrative divisions
 (prior to December 1, 2005)
 (after December 1, 2005)

Demographics

Vital statistics
Source: Russian Federal State Statistics Service

Ethnic groups
According to the 2002 Census, Komi-Permyaks make up 59.0% of the okrug's population.  Other groups include Russians (38.2%), Tatars (1,100, or 0.8%), Ukrainians (706, or 0.5%), Belarusians (672, or 0.5%), and a host of other groups, each accounting for less than 0.5% of the total population.

References

Further reading

Geography of Perm Krai
States and territories established in 1925
2005 disestablishments in Russia
Perm Krai
Russian-speaking countries and territories
1925 establishments in Russia